Noise, commonly known as static, white noise, static noise, or snow, in analog video and television, is a random dot pixel pattern of static displayed when no transmission signal is obtained by the antenna receiver of television sets and other display devices.

Description
The random pixel pattern is superimposed on the picture or the television screen, being visible as a random flicker of "dots", "snow" or "fuzzy zig-zags" in some television sets, is the result of electronic noise and radiated electromagnetic noise accidentally picked up by the antenna like air or cable. This effect is most commonly seen with analog TV sets,  blank VHS tapes, or other display devices.

There are many sources of electromagnetic noise which cause the characteristic display patterns of static. Atmospheric sources of noise are the most ubiquitous, and include electromagnetic signals prompted by cosmic microwave background radiation, or more localized radio wave noise from nearby electronic devices.

The display device itself is also a source of noise, due in part to thermal noise produced by the inner electronics. Most of this noise comes from the first transistor the antenna is attached to.

Names
UK viewers used to see "snow" on black after sign-off, instead of "bugs" on white, a purely technical artifact due to old 405-line British senders using positive rather than the negative video modulation used in Canada, the U.S., and (currently) the UK as well.  Since one impression of the "snow" is of fast-flickering black bugs on a white background, the phenomenon is often called myrornas krig in Swedish, myrekrig in Danish, hangyák háborúja in Hungarian, Ameisenkrieg in German, and semut bertengkar in Indonesian, which all translate to "war of the ants". 

It is also known as ekran karıncalanması in Turkish, meaning "ants on the screen", hangyafoci in Hungarian which means "ant football", and in Romanian, purici, which translates into "fleas". In French however, this phenomenon is mostly called neige (snow), just like in Dutch, where it is called sneeuw. In Portugal, it's called formigueiro, meaning either "anthill" or "formication".

In Argentina this video noise is called lluvia (rain), maybe related to the sound that go along with it.  Similarly, this noise is called suna-arashi (sand storm) in Japanese, referring to the natural phenomenon.

Big Bang
Because analog television uses radio waves to carry information, some of the white noise is the television rendering microwaves from the Big Bang. NASA describes, "Turn your television to an 'in between' channel, and part of the static you will see is the afterglow of the big bang". This is also true for radio. When it is adjusted to a frequency that is between stations, part of the sound heard is remnant radiation from the Big Bang from around 13.7 billion years ago.

See also
Interference (wave propagation)
Film grain
Image noise

References

Video
Television terminology
Articles containing video clips